The 1975–76 New York Nets season was the ninth and final season of ABA basketball on Long Island. The Nets won their second ABA Championship.

Draft picks

Roster

Exhibition games
On October 4, 1975, the Nets played their first exhibition game of the season, facing the Washington Bullets of the NBA in the Capital Center in Landover, Maryland. Julius Erving scored 36 points to lead the Nets, but the Bullets managed a one-point victory, 109–108.

The Nets faced the New York Knicks on October 8 in Uniondale, New York. The Nets prevailed, 110–104.

On October 11 the Nets ventured to Buffalo, New York, to face the Buffalo Braves on the Braves' home court. 15,000 fans attended the game. Erving was held to 16 points, but the Nets won by a large margin, 109–83.

The Nets traveled to New Haven, Connecticut, on October 14 to play the Washington Bullets for the second time in the preseason. The Nets avenged their loss of ten days earlier, winning 122–114.

The very next day, on October 15, the Golden State Warriors took the court against the Nets in Uniondale. Erving led the Nets with 43 points but Rick Barry had 49 for Golden State as the Warriors won, 119–114.

Two days later the Nets traveled to Seton Hall for a rematch with the Buffalo Braves on October 17. The Nets won again, 117–97.

The next day, October 18, saw the Nets play their final ABA vs. NBA exhibition game as they took the court at Madison Square Garden to again face the New York Knicks. Julius Erving scored 33 points and hit a jump shot at the buzzer to win the game for the Nets, 103–101.

The Nets finished their ABA tenure with a record of 15 wins and 9 losses against NBA teams in exhibition games. The Nets went 2–0 against the NBA before the 1971–72 season, 0–3 before 1972–73, 4–1 prior to the 1973–74 campaign, 4–3 before the 1974–75 season and 5–2 before the 1975–76 season. Overall, the ABA went 79–76 in the interleague matchups, faring poorly at first but going 62–34 in the last three years of the league.

Regular season

Season standings

Schedule

Player statistics
Note: GP= Games played; MIN= Minutes; STL= Steals; REB = Rebounds; ASST = Assists; BLK = Blocks; PTS = Points

Playoffs
Semifinals vs. San Antonio Spurs

Nets win series 4–3

ABA Finals vs. Denver Nuggets

Nets win series 4–2

This is to date the last title the Nets have won.

Awards, Records and Honors
 Julius Erving, Finals MVP DR J

References

External links
 New York Nets on Basketball Reference

New York Nets season
New Jersey Nets seasons
New York Nets
New York Nets
American Basketball Association championship seasons
Sports in Hempstead, New York